Hemlata Divakar is an Indian politician from the Bharatiya Janata Party. Divakar was a Member of the Uttar Pradesh Legislative Assembly from Agra Rural Constituency in Agra district, from 2017 to 2022.  She had contested UP Vidhan Sabha election in 2012 as a candidate of Samajwadi Party.

References 

Living people
People from Agra
Uttar Pradesh MLAs 2017–2022
Samajwadi Party politicians
Bharatiya Janata Party politicians from Uttar Pradesh
Year of birth missing (living people)